The Namibian Electronic Sports Association (NESA) is the governing and representative body for Electronic Sports in Namibia. It was founded in 2010, and affiliated to IeSF in 2011 as the third country from Africa to obtain membership after South Africa and Egypt. NESA organises various esports leagues and the Namibian National esports team. In 2012 it was closed due to lack of community interest and participation. It was re-opened in 2013 by the original founders and select members from the community. The first formal National Team was selected in 2014 for DotA2, called the Desert Sidewinders. NESA has since awarded National Colours via the Namibian Sports Commission annually and expanded on the number of National titles hosted per year. In 2017 NESA sent the very first Namibian esports athlete abroad to participate in Tekken7 at the IESF World Championship held in Busan, South Korea. More Namibian athletes has since then been sent to partake in the annual IESF World Championship and numerous online international test matches are hosted each year.

NESA continues to develop gaming as a sport within Namibia with the financial support from sponsors and volunteer work from gaming enthusiasts. 
To date, NESA bears a huge gratitude towards the main contributing sponsors over the past years including Logitech, Louis van der Merwe (Vander Designs), Future IT, Nanodog, Indongo Toyota, BDO, Evolve IT, A van der Walt Transport, FNB Namibia and Link Media. 

NESA is a member of the Confederation of African Esports (CAES) which was established in 2008 by Mind Sports South Africa (MSSA). 
NESA is actively working to support more African countries to recognise esports as an official sport and encourage related developments within African communities.

Function
The Namibian Electronic Sports Association (NESA) serves as the governing and representative sports body for electronic sports (esports) in Namibia. NESA governs, facilitates, co-ordinates and administrates the primary and secondary objectives relating to esports in Namibia:

Primary Objectives
 Promotion: Promoting and marketing of esports to the public, corporate and government sectors
 Preparation: Development, training and funding of esports
 Participation: Participation in regional, national and international events and tournaments

Secondary Objectives
 Regulatory and sanctioning functions of esports
 Promote sportsmanship, discipline and sporting etiquette
 Promote healthy, sporting lifestyles and wellness
 Support esports related industries and service providers
 Promote legal electronic practices

International Participation

 December 2010 vs South Africa (playing FIFA 2011 on Xbox)
 December 2010 vs South Africa (playing Call of Duty Modern Warfare on PC, 5vs5)

Important Documents
Constitution
NESA Code of Ethics and Conduct

External links
Namibian Electronic Sports Association site
NGC - Community platform for Gaming/E-Sports

References
News Articles
Article on allAfrica.com
The Namibian Article about NamLAN

News Articles not related to NESA
NOTE: these articles do not necessarily conform to NESA's Constitution or Code of Ethics, but are relevant to the Namibian Electronic Sports Association
CNN Blog Entry about WCG Namibia
Namibian Sun Article about WCG Namibia
allAfrica.com Article about WCG Namibia
Namibia Sports Article about WCG Namibia

Esports governing bodies
Sports organisations of Namibia